One of the Baffin Island offshore island groups, the uninhabited Trinity Islands are located in Foxe Basin, west of Lonebutte Bay. They are part of the Qikiqtaaluk Region, in the Canadian territory of Nunavut.

References

External links 
 Trinity Islands in the Atlas of Canada - Toporama; Natural Resources Canada

Uninhabited islands of Qikiqtaaluk Region